Chandragiri mandal is one of the 34 mandals in Tirupati district of the Indian state of Andhra Pradesh. It is under the administration of Tirupati revenue division and the headquarters are located at Chandragiri.

History 
Chandragiri mandal was a part of Chittoor district until 2022. It was made part of the newly formed Tirupati district effective from 4 April 2022 by the Y. S. Jagan Mohan Reddy-led Government of Andhra Pradesh.

Geography 
The mandal is bounded by Chinnagottigallu, Pulicherla, Ramachandrapuram, Pakala, Penumuru, Vedurukuppam, Tirupati (urban) and Tirupati (rural) mandals.

Demographics 

It had a sex ratio of 1022. Scheduled Castes and Scheduled Tribes made up 12,534 and 3,489 of the population respectively. It had a literacy rate of 73.99% with 82.14% among males and 66.08% among females.

Administration 

Chandragiri mandal is a part of the Tirupati revenue division. The headquarters are located at Chandragiri.  census, the mandal comprises the following 23 villages:

Politics 
Chandragiri mandal is one of the 7 mandals under Chandragiri Assembly constituency, which in turn is a part of Chittoor Lok Sabha constituency of Andhra Pradesh. , the mandal has 43,010 eligible voters with 21,018 male and 21,992 female voters. Chevireddy Bhaskar Reddy is representing the Chandragiri constituency as the Member of the Legislative Assembly (MLA) in Andhra Pradesh Legislative Assembly, and N. Reddeppa is representing the Chittoor constituency as the Member of Parliament (MP) in Lok Sabha.

See also 
 List of mandals of Andhra Pradesh

References

Mandals in Tirupati district